The 2003–04 season was Wycombe Wanderers's 116th season of competitive association football, and tenth consecutive season in the Football League Second Division. They finished 24th of 24 and were relegated to the newly formed Football League Two. They also competed in the FA Cup, Football League Cup and Football League Trophy.

Season summary
Manager Lawrie Sanchez was sacked by the club on 30 September 2003, with Tony Adams appointed as his successor on 5 November 2003. They finished bottom on 37 points.

Players

Competitions

Football League Second Division

League table

Matches

FA Cup

Football League Cup

Football League Trophy

Notes

References

Wycombe Wanderers F.C. seasons
Wycombe Wanderers